Héctor Pace (born 22 July 1944) is an Argentine boxer. He competed in the men's lightweight event at the 1964 Summer Olympics.

References

1944 births
Living people
Argentine male boxers
Olympic boxers of Argentina
Boxers at the 1964 Summer Olympics
Boxers at the 1963 Pan American Games
Pan American Games silver medalists for Argentina
Pan American Games medalists in boxing
Sportspeople from La Plata
Lightweight boxers
Medalists at the 1963 Pan American Games